The men's 200 metres at the 1934 European Athletics Championships was held in Turin, Italy, at the  Stadio Benito Mussolini on 8 and 9 September 1934.

Medalists

Results

Final
9 September

Semi-finals
8 September

Semi-final 1

Semi-final 2

Participation
According to an unofficial count, 12 athletes from 8 countries participated in the event.

 (1)
 (1)
 (1)
 (2)
 (2)
 (1)
 (2)
 (2)

References

200
200 metres at the European Athletics Championships